The Ely City Hall and Fire Station, at 501 Mill St. in Ely in White Pine County, Nevada, was listed on the National Register of Historic Places in 2018.

It "was recognized for its role as the seat of the City of Ely's government from its construction in 1929 to the present, as well as its role as the headquarters for Ely's Fire Department from 1929 to 1999."

References

National Register of Historic Places in Nevada
Buildings and structures completed in 1929
Lincoln County, Nevada